Leon "Lee" Richman (February 23, 1921 – August 31, 2009) was an American football player. 

Born in Los Angeles, Fichman worked as a child actor and attended Los Angeles High School. In the 1932 film "Slide, Babe, Slide", he pitched to Babe Ruth. He played college football for Alabama from 1941 to 1943.

During World War II, he served in the Army, including service at the Battle of the Bulge.  After the war, he played professional football in the National Football League (NFL) as a tackle for the Detroit Lions. He appeared in 11 NFL games during the 1946 season (five as a starter) and one during the 1947 season.

After retiring from football, Fichman worked as a science teacher in Glendale, California, for 28 years. He moved to East Moline, Illinois, in 1960 and worked for 16 years at Arrowhead Ranch.

External links
 "Slide, Babe, Slide" (1932)

References

1921 births
2009 deaths
American football tackles
Alabama Crimson Tide football players
Detroit Lions players
Players of American football from Los Angeles